The 1965 Moroccan riots were street riots in the cities of Morocco, originating in Casablanca in March 1965. They began with a student protest, which expanded to include marginalized members of the population. The number of casualties incurred is contested. Moroccan authorities reported a dozen deaths, whereas the foreign press and the Union nationale des forces populaires (UNFP) counted more than 1000 deaths.

Background 
Hassan II became King of Morocco upon the death of Mohammed V on February 26, 1961. In December 1962, his appointees drafted a constitution which kept political power in the hands of the monarchy. Hassan II also abandoned the foreign policy of nonalignment and proclaimed hostility towards the newly independent, newly socialist nation of Algeria—resulting in the 1963–1964 "Sand War".

The Union nationale des forces populaires, under the leadership of Mehdi Ben Barka, expanded its membership and overtly opposed Hassan II. An allied student group, the Union nationale des étudiants du Maroc (UNEM) — which formed as a nationalist, anti-colonial group—now prominently criticized the monarchy. These groups and the regime launched into an escalating cycle of protest and repression which created the conditions for a major confrontation. Eleven UNFP leaders, accused of plotting against the king, were sentenced to death. Ben Barka escaped to France, where he served as a symbolic opposition leader in exile.

Before March 1965, the national minister of education, Youssef Belabbès, originated a circular preventing youth above the age of 17 from attending in the second cycle of lycee (high school). In practice, this rule separated out 60% of students. Although at that time, the Baccalauréat concerned only a small few (1500 per year), for the others it became a rallying symbol which set off the student mobilization. This decision provoked student unrest in Casablanca, Rabat, and other cities.

Events 
On March 22, 1965, thousands of students gathered on the soccer field at Lycée Mohammed-V in Casablanca. They were already numerous by 10 am. According to a witness, there were almost 15,000 students present that morning.

The goal of the assembly was to organize a peaceful march to demand the right to public higher education for Moroccans. Arriving at the street in front of the French cultural center, the demonstration was brutally dispersed by law enforcement. Without further provocation, they discharged their firearms. The students were thus compelled to retreat into the poorer neighborhoods of the city, where they encountered the unemployed. They agreed to meet again the following day.

March 23, 1965 
On March 23, the students gathered again at the stadium of Lycée Mohammed-V. They were soon joined by their parents, workers, and the unemployed, as well as people coming from the bidonvilles (slums). This time, the assembly was not so peaceful. The advancing protesters vandalized stores, burned buses and cars, threw stones, and chanted slogans against the king.

The repression was swift: the army and the police were mobilized. Tanks were deployed for two days to quell the protestors, and General Mohamed Oufkir had no hesitation in firing on the crowd from a helicopter.

The king blamed the events on teachers and parents. He declared, in a message to the nation on March 30, 1965: "Allow me to tell you that there is no greater danger to the State than a so-called intellectual. It would have been better if you were all illiterate."

Aftermath 

After the events of March 23, suspected dissidents including communists and Iraqi teachers were arrested. In April, Hassan II tried to reconcile with the opposition, receiving at Ifrane a delegation from the Union nationale des forces populaires, which included, notably, Abderrahim Bouabid, Abdelhamid Zemmouri and Abderrahmane Youssoufi. They proposed to form a government and demanded to transmit their message to Mehdi Ben Barka. But these discussions resulted in no concrete action.

In June of the same year, Hassan II declared a state of emergency, which lasted until 1970. UNFP continued to criticize the regime. On October 29, Mehdi Ben Barka was abducted and assassinated in Paris. Students in Casablanca rose again on March 23, 1966, and many were arrested.

In reference to these events, members of UNFP proceeded to create a Marxist–Leninist organization, Harakat 23 Mars (March 23 Movement), which much later gave rise in 1983 to the Organisation de l'action démocratique populaire—one of the founding elements of the Unified Socialist Party. Among the personalities who have been active within this movement, one finds the politician Mohamed Bensaid Aït Idder, the researcher and author Abdelghani Abou El Aazm, the consultant Amal Cherif Haouat, and the Belgian politician Mohammed Daïf.

References

Sources 
 Bouissef-Rekab, Driss. À l'ombre de Lalla Chafia. Paris: L'Harmattan, 1991. Ecritures Arabes no. 52. 
 Hughes, Stephen O. Morocco Under King Hassan. Reading, UK: Ithaca Press (Garnet Publishing), 2011. 
 Miller, Susan Gilson. A History of Modern Morocco. Cambridge University Press, 2013. 
 Park, Thomas K., & Aomar Boum. Historical dictionary of Morocco. (Second edition.) Lanham, Maryland: Scarecrow Press, 2006. 
 Rollinde, Marguerite. Le Mouvement marocain des droits de l'Homme: Entre consensus national et engagement citoyen. Paris: Karthala, 2003. (Homme et Société: Sciences économiques et politiques.)

See also 
 Education in Morocco
 Years of Lead (Morocco)
 Human rights in Morocco
 Sûreté Nationale (Morocco)

Student strikes
Protests in Morocco
Hassan II of Morocco
1965 protests
1965 riots
1965 in Morocco

Riots and civil disorder in Morocco